Nərimankənd (also, Narimankend) is a village and municipality in the Gobustan Rayon of Azerbaijan.  It has a population of 3,358. 

Nariman is a name of Persian origin, and Persian word کند kand or kend means village.

References 

Populated places in Gobustan District